Aga Syed Mohsin Al Mosvi is a Kashmiri religious and political leader and a member of the Aga family of Budgam. He is the son of Aga Syed Mustafa Moosavi. He is the brother of the late Aga Syed Hussain and Aga Syed Mehdi.

References

 
 
 
 
 
 
 
 
 
 
 
 
 Rising Kashmir: Leading English newspaper in Jammu and Kashmir
 LS Polls: Srinagar Has The Wealthiest Candidate In Fray | Kashmir Life
 PDP Calls For Gradual Easing Of Lockdown | Kashmir Life
 
 

Shia clerics
Jammu and Kashmir politicians
1964 births
Living people